The 2016–17 Scandinavian Cup was a season of the Scandinavian Cup, a Continental Cup season in cross-country skiing for men and women. The season began on 9 December 2016 in Lillehammer, Norway and concluded with a stage event 3–5 March 2017 in Madona, Latvia.

Calendar

Men

Women

Overall standings

Men's overall standings

Women's overall standings

References 

Scandinavian Cup
Scandinavian Cup seasons
2016 in cross-country skiing
2017 in cross-country skiing